Tribrachium is a monotypic genus of sponges belonging to the family Ancorinidae. The only species is Tribrachium schmidtii.

The species is found in Southern America and Australia.

References

Tetractinellida
Monotypic sponge genera